William H. Chamberlain (January 22, 1931 – October 12, 1972) was a Democratic politician who was elected to various Illinois state offices.

Born in Sangamon County, Illinois, Chamberlain was the delegate to the Democratic National Convention from Illinois in 1964. From 1964 to 1965 he was the Secretary of State for Illinois, thereafter serving as circuit judge until his death in 1972.

He was a member of the Knights of Columbus, Urban League, and American Judicature Society. On his death, he was interred at the Calvary Cemetery in Springfield, Illinois.

There is a baseball field named after Judge Chamberlain in Springfield, Illinois.

References 

1931 births
1972 deaths
Illinois state court judges
Secretaries of State of Illinois
Illinois Democrats
People from Sangamon County, Illinois
20th-century American judges